Henry Hyde Champion (22 January 1859 – 30 April 1928) was a socialist journalist and activist, regarded as one of the leading spirits behind the formation of the Independent Labour Party. Up to 1893, he lived and worked in Great Britain, moving after that date to Australia.

Biography

Early life
Champion was born in Poona, India on 22 January 1859, the son of Major-General James Hyde Champion, and his wife Henrietta Susan, née Urquhart, of aristocratic Scottish descent.

Henry was sent to England at four years of age to attend a day school and from 13 was educated at Marlborough College, later he attended the Royal Military Academy, Woolwich. He entered the army and fought with the artillery in the Afghan War of 1879. There he caught typhoid and was sent back to England.

A radical friend showed Champion the London East End slums; his friend also accompanied Champion to the United States where Champion was influenced by the writings of Henry George.

Socialist in England
Champion resigned his army commission 17 September 1882 in disgust over conduct of the Egyptian War of that year and joined the socialist movement. He became assistant secretary of the Social Democratic Federation (SDF) and wrote for the socialist paper, Justice. In 1886 with John Burns, Henry Hyndman and Jack Williams he was indicted for seditious conspiracy in connexion with the Trafalgar Square riots, after conducting his own defence he was acquitted.

Champion bought a half-share in a printing plant and published a paper called To-Day, and in 1885-86 George Bernard Shaw's early novel Cashel Byron's Profession appeared in it as a serial. It was published separately by Champion in 1886. This was the first of Shaw's works published in book form.

Champion joined the Labour Electoral Association and founded a newspaper called Labour Elector in 1888.

In 1889 Champion was one of the leaders of the dock labourers' strike, to the funds of which a large sum was sent from Australia. Soon afterwards he had a disagreement with some of his fellow socialists, broke away, and for a time was assistant-editor of the Nineteenth Century. He stood as an independent candidate for the House of Commons at Aberdeen, but, though he polled fairly well, was defeated and soon afterwards went to Melbourne to find relief from illness, arriving on 12 August 1890.

Henry Hyde Champion is regarded by some as the father of the Independent Labour Party. Historian Joseph Clayton wrote in 1926:

"When the first annual conference took place at Bradford in January 1893 and was seen to thrive, Champion could write in The Labour Elector: 'We have created the ILP and set it on its legs.'
"The boast has truth in it. For if any one man could say 'I created the ILP,' that man was Henry Hyde Champion. Others, and notably James Keir Hardie, are extolled as founders of the ILP..... Keir Hardie, Joseph Burgess, Robert Blatchford – were but midwives. The real father was H.H. Champion. And if Champion has been pushed out of the scene, it is partly because he left England for Australia; and partly because, indifferent to fame, he was ambitious rather to get things done than to have the credit for the accomplished fact. 
"But Champion is the man whom the student of history, writing without bias and without axe to grind on behalf of reputation for the living or the dead, without fear of foe or favour for friend, unswayed by personal predilection for the character of this man or the policy of that, will name as the real creator of the ILP. It was Champion who discerned that the Socialist League with its non-parliamentary policy and Anarchist sympathies would never command the support of the British people, always strongly attached to parliamentary institutions; that the SDF in its devotion to the pure gospel of Marx made no appeal to Trade Unionists anxious for small but pressing changes that would better their condition; that Labour Electoral Associations in the control of Liberal Trade Unionists would accomplish nothing that would diminish the power of the Capitalist."

Australia

Henry Hyde Champion emigrated to Australia in 1893 at the age of 34. He was an anti-vivisectionist and vegetarian.

In 1895 Champion established a weekly paper the Champion which lasted until 1897, and he also published in Melbourne in 1895 The Root of the Matter, a series of dialogues on social questions, which gave moderate statement of the socialist position, but attracted little attention. Champion could not, however, find his place in politics in Australia. He could not see eye to eye with the Australian Labor Party, and a statement, possibly made in haste, that this party consisted of lions led by asses did not help the position. He was a candidate for South Melbourne for the Victorian Legislative Assembly supported now by many at the Trades Hall; the campaign revolved round his personal reputation and he had the satisfaction of prosecuting Max Hirsch and extracting an apology and costs, however he lost the election.

Champion then settled down as a leader writer for The Age. His wife successfully conducted the Book Lovers' Library and Bookshop, and in connection with this Champion published a monthly literary paper, the Book Lover, which ran 1899–1921. He also wrote occasionally for the Socialist and The Bulletin. He had a long period of ill-health before his death at Melbourne on 30 April 1928. He married Elsie Belle, sister of Vida Goldstein and daughter of Lieut.-Colonel Goldstein and Isabella Goldstein, who survived him. He had no children.

Champion interested himself in social movements, was a foundation member of the Anti-Sweating League, and he organized the first appeal which resulted in the foundation of the Queen Victoria Hospital for Women and Children. He also founded the Australasian authors' agency and published a few books with literary merit.

Footnotes

Further reading
 John Barnes, "Gentleman Crusader: Henry Hyde Champion in the Early Socialist Movement," History Workshop Journal, no. 60 (Autumn 2005), pp. 116–138. In JSTOR
 Geoffrey Serle, 'Champion, Henry Hyde (1859–1928)', Australian Dictionary of Biography, Volume 7, MUP, 1979, pp 603–605.

1859 births
1928 deaths
Anti-vivisectionists
Australian journalists
Australian people of English descent
British military personnel of the Second Anglo-Afghan War
English trade unionists
Graduates of the Royal Military Academy, Woolwich
Members of the Fabian Society
People educated at Marlborough College
Social Democratic Federation members